Young's Bus Service is an Australian bus operator in Rockhampton, Queensland operating services under the QConnect scheme in Regional Queensland. It is the largest operator in the Rockhampton region.

Service Area
Young's Bus Service operate from the Capricorn Coast in the North-East to Mount Morgan and Gracemere to the south and select areas in the City of Rockhampton.

Fleet
The fleet began in 1949 with just one vehicle when founder Stan Young registered a single charter bus.

As of July 2021, the fleet had grown to 42 buses with white and pink livery. The service also had a contract to carry about 1,800 local school students on daily school bus services.

In July 2021, the Young family announced the company had been sold to ComfortDelGro Australia, ending a period of more than 70 years of Young's Bus Service being an independent local family business. ComfortDelGro said the acquisition of the Young's Bus Service fleet would enable it to expand its operations in Queensland where it already has a fleet of 155 buses and was a further step in their expansion into the regional Australia market.   Prior to commencing the transition, ComfortDelGro made assurances that employees with Young's Bus Service would retain their jobs.

easy-travel Fare Card
Young’s Bus Service issues the easy-travel Fare Card for use as payment on its services.

See also
Sunbus Rockhampton
QConnect

References

Bus companies of Queensland
ComfortDelGro companies
Rockhampton